The Belgian Racing Car Championship (formerly Belcar Endurance Championship or Belgian GT Championship) is a national sports car racing championship primarily in Belgium.  The series is sanctioned by the Royal Automobile Club of Belgium and run by Kronos Event.

Since the 2007 season, the series has run three classes. The top class is for cars conforming to international GT3 regulations, similar to those in the FIA GT3 European Championship.  Division 2 is the "Belcar Promotion" class, for one-make series "Cup" cars as well as international GT4 machinery.  Division 3 is for "Belcar Specials", a holdover class from previous years.

Typical race lengths are 2 hours; however, the Zolder 24 Hours is included in the championship, with points awarded at 6, 12, and 24 hours.

External links
 Official Belcar website

References 

Sports car racing series
Auto racing series in Belgium
National championships in Belgium
Group GT3